The Kia K9, marketed as the Kia K900 in the United States and Canada and as the Kia Quoris in other export markets, is a full-size luxury sedan manufactured and marketed by Kia, now in its second generation.

The K9 was launched in South Korea in May 2012, with export sales beginning in late 2012. As of June 2013, it was sold in South Korea, the Middle East, Colombia, Chile, Guatemala, Peru, Russia, the United States, and Canada. There are plans to release it in China, although Kia will not use the Quoris nameplate after it lost a legal battle. The K900 was discontinued in Canada by 2018, and the United States in January 2021.

The second generation K9 was launched in 2018.



First generation (KH; 2012)

The K9 is a derivative of the Hyundai Equus and Genesis, with which it shares the BH-L (VI) platform. It is the first rear-wheel-drive sedan Kia offered in the United States. The K9's development code was KH.

The K9 is slightly shorter than the Equus, and has a longer wheelbase than the Hyundai Genesis with shorter front overhang dimensions. The Quoris features Kia's "Tiger nose" grill as well as blind spot detection, head-up display and an adaptive front lighting system.

Launch engines in Korea include a   V6 and a   GDI (Gasoline Direction-Injection) V6, coupled with an eight-speed automatic transmission.

The Quoris debuted in Russia in 2013 with a  3.8L V6.

The K900 in the US uses a   GDI V8, producing  of torque. In Canada, the K900 can be fitted with either a  3.8L GDI V6, producing  of torque or the same 5.0L GDI V8 as the US market.

Powertrain

Second generation (RJ; 2018)

Kia debuted the all new K9/K900 (still sold as the Quoris in a few markets) at the March 2018 New York International Auto Show. It retains the same 8-speed transmission, as well as the same three engine choices. The interior features higher quality leather and wood trim, as well as an analog clock developed by Maurice Lacroix. Kia also introduced an AWD model in South Korea for the second generation.

Facelift 
The exterior images of the newer facelift version were released on 17 May 2021. Compared to the pre-facelift model, it got a wider grille with chrome V logos, a full-width rear lamp, and a repositioned number plate. This version also got a tweaked interior, such as a larger 14.5-inch infotainment display and fingerprint authentication system.

Powertrain

Marketing and sales
To promote the K900, Kia Motors released their Super Bowl XLVIII commercial, featuring Laurence Fishburne reprising his role as Morpheus from The Matrix series. In October 2014, basketball player LeBron James was named Kia's K900 luxury ambassador.

The Kia K900 sold over 200 units per month from April to June in the U.S. market its launch year. Sales dropped to roughly 100-130 units in July and August 2014, and then to 56 in September and up to 62 October.

The K900 was discontinued in 2018 in Canada, and in 2021 in the United States. Kia cited the market transition from large cars to crossovers and SUVs. Only 305 units of the K900 were sold in the US in 2020.

See also
 Kia GT Concept
 Kia Stinger
 Kia Opirus

References

External links

 (International)

2010s cars
K9
Flagship vehicles
Full-size vehicles
Luxury vehicles
Rear-wheel-drive vehicles
Sedans
Cars introduced in 2012
Limousines